is a Japanese footballer who last played as a full-back or left midfielder for USL Championship side Oakland Roots SC.

Playing career
Soya Takahashi joined J1 League champions Sanfrecce Hiroshima in 2014.

In March 2021, Takahashi joined Oakland Roots SC in the USL Championship.

Club statistics
Updated to 22 February 2019.

References

External links

Profile at Sanfrecce Hiroshima
Soya Takahashi at Fotbolltransfers

1996 births
Living people
Association football people from Shimane Prefecture
Japanese footballers
Japanese expatriate footballers
J1 League players
J2 League players
J3 League players
Allsvenskan players
Sanfrecce Hiroshima players
Fagiano Okayama players
AFC Eskilstuna players
J.League U-22 Selection players
Association football defenders
Japanese expatriate sportspeople in Sweden
Expatriate footballers in Sweden
Superettan players
Oakland Roots SC players
Japanese expatriate sportspeople in the United States
Expatriate soccer players in the United States